{{Infobox stadium
| name                = Adem Jashari Olympic Stadium
| native_name         = Stadiumi Olimpik Adem Jashari (sq)
| image               = Olympisches Stadium "Adem Jashari" Mitrovicë.jpg
| image_size          = 300px
| caption             = UEFA stadium category: 
| fullname            = Stadiumi Olimpik Adem Jashari
| location            = Mitrovica, Kosovo
| coordinates         = 
| broke_ground        = 1938
| built               =
| opened              =
| renovated           = 2014, 2016, 2017, 2020–ongoing
| expanded            =
| closed              =
| demolished          =
| owner               =
| operator            = Football Federation of Kosovo
| surface             = Grass
| construction_cost   =
| architect           =
| structural engineer =
| services engineer   =
| general_contractor  =
| project_manager     =
| main_contractors    =
| former_names        =
| tenants             = KF TrepçaKFF Mitrovica (selected matches)Kosovo national football teams
| capacity            = 20,000

| record_attendance   = 35,000 
| dimensions          = 
| scoreboard          = LED
}}
The Adem Jashari Olympic Stadium''' is a multi-purpose stadium in Mitrovica, Kosovo, which is used mostly for football matches and is the home ground of KF Trepça. The stadium has a capacity of around 35,000 people or 16,300 seated. After the Kosovo War, the stadium was renamed in honour of Adem Jashari, one of the founders of the Kosovo Liberation Army.

History

International matches
On 31 October 1979, it hosted a UEFA Euro 1980 qualifying match of Yugoslavia against Romania and finished with the result 2–1. On 5 March 2014, after 35 years hosted the first permitted by FIFA match of the Kosovo against Haiti and finished with the result 0–0.

Inauguration
On 4 July 2017, after renovation was held a qualifying match for 2017–18 UEFA Champions League against Faroese club Víkingur Gøta. Playing for the first time at the recently refurbished Adem Jashari Olympic Stadium.

References

External links

Olympic Stadium Adem Jashari at EU-Football.info

Multi-purpose stadiums
Buildings and structures in Mitrovica, Kosovo
Football venues in Kosovo
Football venues in Yugoslavia
Athletics (track and field) venues in Kosovo
Athletics (track and field) venues in Yugoslavia
Stadium